Our Lady of Lourdes is a title of the Virgin Mary. She is venerated under this title by the Roman Catholic church due to her apparitions that occurred in Lourdes, France. The first apparition of 11 February 1858, of which Bernadette Soubirous (age 14) told her mother that a "Lady" spoke to her in the cave of Massabielle ( from the town) while she was gathering firewood with her sister and a friend. Similar apparitions of the "Lady" were reported on 18 occasions that year, until the climax revelation in which she introduced herself as: "I am the Immaculate Conception". On 18 January 1862, the local Bishop of Tarbes Bertrand-Sévère Laurence endorsed the veneration of the Blessed Virgin Mary in Lourdes.

On 1 February 1876, Pope Pius IX officially granted a decree of canonical coronation to the image as Notre-Dame du Saint Rosaire. The coronation was performed by Cardinal Pier Francesco Meglia at the courtyard of what is now part of the Rosary Basilica on 3 July 1876.

The image of Our Lady of Lourdes has been widely copied and reproduced in shrines and homes, often in garden landscapes. Bernadette Soubirous was canonized by Pope Pius XI in 1933.

Marian devotion has since steadily increased as ecclesiastical investigations sanctioned her visions. In later years, a large church was built at the site that has since  become a major site of religious pilgrimage.

Apparitions 

On 11 February 1858, Soubirous went with her sister Toinette and neighbor Jeanne Abadie to collect some firewood. While taking off her shoes and stockings to wade through the water near the Grotto of Massabielle, she said she heard the sound of two gusts of wind but the trees and bushes nearby did not move. A wild rose in a natural niche in the grotto, however, did move.

Soubirous tried to make the sign of the cross but could not, as her hands were trembling. The lady smiled, and invited Soubirous to pray the rosary with her. Soubirous tried to keep this a secret, but Toinette told her mother. After parental cross-examination, she and her sister received corporal punishment for their story.

Three days later, 14 February, Soubirous returned to the grotto. She had brought holy water as a test that the apparition was not of evil origin/provenance: "The second time was the following Sunday … Then I started to throw holy water in her direction, and at the same time I said that if she came from God she was to stay, but if not, she must go. She started to smile, and bowed ... This was the second time."

Soubirous' companions are said to have become afraid when they saw her in ecstasy. She remained ecstatic even as they returned to the village. On 18 February, she spoke of being told by the Lady to return to the Grotto over a period of two weeks. She quoted the apparition: "The Lady only spoke to me the third time … She told me also that she did not promise to make me happy in this world, but in the next."

Soubirous was ordered by her parents to never go there again. She went anyway, and on 24 February, Soubirous related that the apparition asked for prayer and penitence for the conversion of sinners.
 
The next day, she said the apparition asked her to dig in the ground and drink from the spring she found there. This made her dishevelled and some of her supporters were dismayed, but this act revealed the stream that soon became a focal point for pilgrimages. Although it was muddy at first, the stream became increasingly clean. As word spread, this water was given to medical patients of all kinds, and many reports of miraculous cures followed. Seven of these cures were confirmed as lacking any medical explanations by Professor Verges in 1860. The first person with a "certified miracle" was a woman whose right hand had been deformed as a consequence of an accident. Several miracles turned out to be short-term improvement or even hoaxes, and Catholic Church and government officials became increasingly concerned. The government fenced off the grotto and issued stiff penalties for anybody trying to get near the off-limits area. In the process, Lourdes became a national issue in France, resulting in the intervention of Emperor Napoleon III with an order to reopen the grotto on 4 October 1858. The church had decided to stay away from the controversy altogether.

Soubirous, knowing the local area well, managed to visit the barricaded grotto under cover of darkness. There, on 25 March, she said she was told: "I am the Immaculate Conception". On Easter Sunday, 7 April, her examining doctor stated that Soubirous, in ecstasy, was observed to have held her hands over a lit candle without sustaining harm. On 16 July, Soubirous went for the last time to the grotto. "I have never seen her so beautiful before," she reported.

The Catholic Church, faced with nationwide questions, decided to institute an investigative commission on 17 November 1858. On 18 January 1860, the local bishop finally declared that: "The Virgin Mary did appear indeed to Bernadette Soubirous." These events established the Marian veneration in Lourdes, which together with Fátima and the Basilica of Our Lady of Guadalupe is one of the most frequented Marian shrines in the world, and to which between 4 and 6 million pilgrims travel annually.

In 1863, Joseph-Hugues Fabisch was charged to create a statue of the Virgin according to Soubirous's description. The work was placed in the grotto and solemnly dedicated on 4 April 1864 in presence of 20,000 pilgrims.
 
The veracity of the apparitions of Lourdes is not an article of faith for Catholics. Nevertheless, all recent popes have visited the Marian shrine at some time. Benedict XV, Pius XI, and John XXIII went there as bishops, Pius XII as papal delegate. He also issued an encyclical, on the one-hundredth anniversary of the apparitions in 1958. John Paul II visited Lourdes three times during his pontificate, and twice before as a bishop.

Bernadette's description of Mary 

Soubirous described the apparition as dressed in a flowing white robe, with a blue sash around her waist. This was the uniform of a religious group called the Children of Mary, which, on account of her poverty, Soubirous was not permitted to join (although she was admitted after the apparitions). Her aunt Bernarde was a long-time member.

The statue that currently stands in the niche within the grotto of Massabielle was created by the Lyonnais sculptor Joseph-Hugues Fabisch in 1864. Although it has become an iconographic symbol of Our Lady of Lourdes, it depicts a figure which is not only older and taller than Soubirous' description, but also more in keeping with orthodox and traditional representations of the Virgin Mary. On seeing the statue, Soubirous was profoundly disappointed with this representation of her vision.

Similar events 
In nearby Lestelle-Bétharram, only a few kilometres from Lourdes, some shepherds guarding their flocks in the mountains observed a vision of a ray of light that guided them to the discovery of a statue of the Virgin Mary. Two attempts were made to remove the statue to a more prominent position; each time it disappeared and returned to its original location, at which a small chapel was built for it.

In the early 16th century, a 12-year-old shepherdess called Anglèze de Sagazan received a vision of the Virgin Mary near the spring at Garaison (part of the commune of Monléon-Magnoac), somewhat further away. Anglèze's story is strikingly similar to that of Soubirous: she was a pious but illiterate and poorly educated girl, extremely impoverished, who spoke only in the local language, Gascon Occitan, but successfully convinced authorities that her vision was genuine and persuaded them to obey the instructions of her apparitions. Like Soubirous, she was the only one who could see the apparition (others could apparently hear it); however, the apparition at Garaison's supernatural powers tended toward the miraculous provision of abundant food, rather than healing the sick and injured. Mid-nineteenth century commentators noted the parallels between the events at Massabielle and Garaison, and interpreted the similarities as proof of the divine nature of Soubirous' claims. At the time of Soubirous, Garaison was a noted center of pilgrimage and Marian devotion.

There are also several similarities between the apparition at La Salette, near Grenoble, and Lourdes. La Salette is many hundreds of kilometres from Lourdes, and the events at La Salette predate those in Lourdes by 12 years. However, the Marian apparition at La Salette was tall and maternal (not petite and gentle like her Lourdes apparition) and had a darker, more threatening series of messages. It is not certain if Soubirous was aware of the events at La Salette.

Approval by a local bishop
On 18 January 1862, the Bishop of Tarbes Betrand Severt Laurence declared the following regarding the Marian apparitions:

Pontifical approbations

 Pope Pius IX approved the veneration in Lourdes and supported the building of the Cathedral in 1870 to which he donated several gifts. He approved indulgences and issued a canonical coronation to the courtyard image of the basilica on 1 February 1876. The coronation ceremony was performed by Cardinal Meglia on 3 July 1876.
 Pope Leo XIII issued an apostolic letter  in commemoration of the consecration of the new cathedral in Lourdes in 1879. He later issued a decree for a canonical coronation towards an image of Lourdes for Pondicherry, India on 21 February 1886. The rite of coronation was carried on 8 May 1886. The same pontiff also made comparative remarks to the Basilica of Our Lady of Brebières remarking it as "The Lourdes of the North" due to the influx of Marian pilgrims and miraculous claims of healings attached to the site. 
 As Archbishop of Bologna, Archbishop Giacomo della Chiesa (the future Pope Benedict XV) organized a diocesan pilgrimage to Lourdes, requesting for Marian veneration in that area.
Pope Pius X in 1907 introduced the feast of the apparition of the Immaculate Virgin of Lourdes. In the same year he issued his encyclical , in which he specifically repeated the permission to venerate the virgin in Lourdes.
 Pope Pius XI beatified the Marian visionary Bernadette Soubirous on 6 June 1925 and canonized her on the Feast of the Immaculate Conception on 8 December 1933 and determined her feast day to be 18 February. He later on 16 July 1934 issued a decree Edocemur Admomum confirming privileges of patronage and coronation for an image with the same namesake for the Church of Saint Martin in Stella, Liguria in Savona, Italy. This document was signed  by Cardinal Eugenio Pacelli. Later in 1937, the pope sent the same cardinal as his legate to personally visit the sanctuary at Lourdes.

 Pope Pius XII issued a papal encyclical  on the 100th centenary anniversary of the Marian apparitions of Lourdes.
 As Archbishop of Milan, Giovanni Battista Montini (the future Pope Paul VI) visited Lourdes.
 Pope John Paul II made three religious pilgrimages to Lourdes. He also instituted the World Day of the Sick in honor of Our Lady of Lourdes on 13 May 1992.
 Pope Benedict XVI issued a novelty coronation towards the Lourdes image on World Day of the Sick in 2007. In September 2008, he visited Lourdes commemorating the 150th anniversary of the Marian apparitions.
 Pope Francis granted a canonical coronation towards a Lourdes image for the Philippines on 5 September 2019. The coronation took place on 22 August 2020.

Reported healings

The location of the spring was described to Soubirous by an apparition of Our Lady of Lourdes on 25 February 1858. Since that time many thousands of pilgrims to Lourdes have followed the instruction of Our Lady of Lourdes to "drink at the spring and wash in it".

Lourdes water has become a focus of devotion to the Virgin Mary at Lourdes. The Catholic Church has formally endorsed, although not dogmatic, for sick people to bathe and visit Lourdes for healing. Since the apparitions, many people have claimed to have been cured by drinking or bathing in it, and the Lourdes authorities provide it free of charge to any who ask for it.

An analysis of the water was commissioned by then mayor of Lourdes, Monsieur Anselme Lacadé in 1858. It was conducted by a professor in Toulouse, who determined that the water was potable and that it contained the following: oxygen, nitrogen, carbonic acid, carbonates of lime and magnesia, a trace of carbonate of iron, an alkaline carbonate or silicate, chlorides of potassium and sodium, traces of sulphates of potassium and soda, traces of ammonia, and traces of iodine. Essentially, the water is pure and inert. Lacadé had hoped that Lourdes water might have special mineral properties which would allow him to develop Lourdes into a spa town, to compete with neighbouring Cauterets and Bagnères-de-Bigorre.

The Lourdes Medical Bureau

To ensure claims of cures were examined properly and to protect the town from fraudulent claims of miracles, the Lourdes Medical Bureau (Bureau Medical) was established at the request of Pope Pius X. It is completely under medical rather than ecclesiastical supervision. Approximately 7,500 people have sought to have their case confirmed as a miracle, of which 70 have been declared scientifically inexplicable by the bureau.

Sanctuary of Our Lady of Lourdes 

The Sanctuary of Our Lady of Lourdes is a group of churches, religious buildings and places of worship on the site where the Lourdes apparitions occurred in 1858, in the town of Lourdes, in France. The area is owned and administered by the Roman Catholic Church and is a destination for millions of pilgrims coming to venerate Our Lady of Lourdes. The sanctuary holds devotional activities, offices, and ensures accommodation for sick pilgrims and their helpers. The 52 hectares area of the sanctuary includes the grotto of Massabielle where Bernadette Soubirous is said to have seen the Virgin Mary and three basilicas, known as the Upper Basilica, the Lower Basilica and the Underground Basilica. It also includes a church, several chapels, a calvary on a hill, an area of ground for gatherings, a square and alleys for processions, fountains providing Lourdes water to pilgrims, baths for immersion in Lourdes water, residences for sick and disabled pilgrims, and the offices of the Lourdes Medical Bureau. The sanctuary is visited by millions each year, and Lourdes has become one of the prominent pilgrimage sites of the world. Large numbers of sick pilgrims travel to Lourdes each year in the hope of physical healing or spiritual renewal.

Other places of veneration 

 The Grotta di Lourdes at the Gardens of Vatican City
 The University of Notre Dame Indiana, USA
 The internal grotto of Church of Notre Dame (New York City)
 Mount Saint Mary's University, Emmitsburg, Maryland
 Saint Mary-of-the-Woods, Sisters of Providence
 The Shrine of the Most Blessed Sacrament in Hanceville, Alabama
 Shrine of St. Therese of Lisieux in Nesquehoning, Pennsylvania
 Saint Anne's Shrine in Fall River, Massachusetts
 The Shrine of Lourdes in Litchfield, Connecticut
 Lourdes Grotto, Baguio City, Philippines
 Lourdes Grotto, San Jose Del Monte, Bulacan, Philippines
 National Shrine of Our Lady of Lourdes, Quezon City, Philippines
 Myeongdong Cathedral, Seoul, South Korea
 Gruta Nuestra Señora de Lourdes, Mar del Plata, Buenos Aires, Argentina
 Flatrock, Newfoundland and Labrador, Canada
 The Carfin Grotto, Scotland

Venerated images with pontifical decree 

 Pope Pius IX granted a decree of coronation towards the image at the courtyard of the Rosary Basilica in Lourdes, France on 1 February 1876. 
 Pope Leo XIII let the image of the high altar in the Shrine of Our Lady of Lourdes in Pondicherry, India crowned via decree on 21 February 1886. 
 The image enshrined at the parish of Saint Martin in Stella, Savona, Italy was crowned in July 1909; Pope Pius XI decreed that with special privileges on 16 July 1934. 
 The national image in Quezon City, Philippines was crowned by Pope Francis via formal decree on 5 September 2019.

In popular culture 

 In 1941, the events became the basis of Franz Werfel's best-selling novel The Song of Bernadette. In 1943, the novel was filmed under the same title. Jennifer Jones played the title role while Linda Darnell portrayed the Virgin Mary.
 In 1961 Daniéle Ajoret portrayed Bernadette in Bernadette of Lourdes (French title:  or Love is Enough) of Robert Darène.
The 1997 book The Diving Bell and the Butterfly by Jean-Dominique Bauby features a scene in which he and his girlfriend, Josephine, go to see Our Lady of Lourdes, known in the book as the Madonna.
 The 2009 French feature film Lourdes tells the story of wheelchair user Christine, who in order to escape her isolation, makes a life changing journey to Lourdes, the iconic site of pilgrimage in the Pyrenees.
  Lourdes, documentary 2019.

See also

Notes

References

Citations

Works cited

External links
 Sanctuary of Our Lady of Lourdes – Official website
 The Grotto of the Apparitions – Online transmissions
 The cures at Lourdes recognised as miraculous by the Church 
 Pilgrimage of His Holiness John Paul II to Lourdes on the Occasion of the 150th Anniversary of the Promulgation of the Dogma of the Immaculate Conception
  – Our Lady of Lourdes

 
Lourdes
Shrines to the Virgin Mary
Catholic Church in France
Titles of Mary
1858 in France
1858 in Christianity
February 1858 events